Meprin B (meprin-b) is an enzyme. This enzyme catalyses the following chemical reaction

 Hydrolysis of proteins, including azocasein, and peptides. Hydrolysis of -His5-Leu-, -Leu6-Cys-, -Ala14-Leu- and -Cys19-Gly- bonds in insulin B chain

Even though it is primarily found and embedded into the cell membrane it can also be found in the extracellular space. Like other meprins it can hydrolyze different molecules.

This membrane-bound metalloendopeptidase is present in mouse intestines.

References

External links 
 

EC 3.4.24